Stacy Levy (born 1960) is a sculptor who works with ecological natural patterns and processes, often using water and water flows as a medium.  Many of her works address environmental problems at the same time that they make the functioning of the environment visible. Her studio is based in rural Pennsylvania, but she works on projects around the world.

Biography
Stacy Levy studied at the Architectural Association School of Architecture.
She graduated from Yale University with a BA in Sculpture, studied at Skowhegan School of Painting and Sculpture, and graduated from the Tyler School of Art at Temple University with a MFA in Sculpture.

Work 

Stacy Levy uses the language of landscape and art to tell the ecological story of a site, drawing on both art and science. Her projects reveal the sometime hidden natural world in the urban environment.  Stacy's work integrates art with site design to create memorable places alive with nature and sensation. Her projects distill the essence of nature and reveal its processes to the user. Stacy works closely with building architects, landscape architects, engineers, horticulturalists and soil scientists to create artworks that allow natural systems like the infiltration of rainwater, to function and thrive. Through a lyrical approach to natural science, Levy blends an understanding of sustainable design and ecological concepts and harnesses the ephemeral changes of weather and light with the lasting presence of sculpture.

From rivers to runoff, Levy has explored the many facets of water: urban watersheds, storm water, hydrologic patterns and water treatment. Her installation "Calendar of Rain" creates a year-long record of precipitation, collected daily in shimmering glass jars.   Her project "Tide Poles" for the City of Yonkers' waterfront incorporates the use of LED technology to visually manifest the ebb and flow of the Hudson River tide. Her projects "Tide Field" and "River Rooms"  at Bartram's Garden in Philadelphia offer visitors new ways to become more aware of and engage with changes in the river.

Levy has completed numerous rainwater pieces including a watershed rain terrace for Penn State University's new Arboretum, and a rain garden for Springside School with the Philadelphia Water Department and the Pennsylvania Horticultural Society. She has public commissions in New York, Seattle, Philadelphia, Tampa, Toronto and Niigata, Japan.

Recent works

Spiral Wetland, 2013

Lake Fayetteville, Fayetteville, AR

Spiral Wetland is an eco-art project supported by the Walton ArtCenter as part of the Artosphere Festival in Fayetteville, Arkansas on Lake Fayetteville.

Spiral Wetland is made with native soft rush, Juncus effusus, growing in a closed-cell foam mat anchored to the lake's floor. The plants help remove excess nutrients like nitrogen and phosphorus from the lake water, and the mat adds shade for fish habitat. Inspired by Spiral Jetty (1970), Robert Smithson's famous earthwork sited in the Great Salt Lake, Utah, this spiral is a working earthwork floating on the surface of the lake.

Tide Flowers, 2012

Hudson River Park, Piers 34 and 25, New York, NY  on hold

Hudson River Park Trust with Mathews Neilsen Landscape Architects

33 units 9' wide Marine vinyl, steel, polycarbonate plastic, foam.

The Hudson River, brushing against the concrete and glass of the urban fabric, rises up and down twice a day with the eternal clock of the tides. This tidal activity connects us to the ocean, to the moon and to a daily schedule that is nature's own.

Tide Flowers will register the tidal movement with a simple visual presence of brilliantly-colored flowers blooming at high tide and closing at low tide. Tide Flowers is made up of thirty-three flower units, each with six petals, attached to selected wooden piles on two piers. Twenty-five flowers will be placed in a field-like formation on selected pilings at the end of pier 25, visible from both the path and the new park. Eight additional tide flowers will be attached to pilings closer to the pathway to give park users a hint of the larger field of flowers beyond.

River Eyelash, 2005

Three Rivers Arts Festival, Pittsburgh, PA

3,000 painted buoys radiate out from the bulkhead of the Point State Park, like an eyelash for the city. The eyelash continuously changes formation in response to wind direction, speed of the currents and boat wakes.

Kept Out, 2009-2010

Schuylkill Center for Environmental Education, Philadelphia, PA. Part of Edible Landscapes, curated by Amy Lipton

Kept Out consists of a pair of deer exclosures, the fenced areas to keep deer out: one built near the artist's studio in a woodland in Pennsylvania's Ridge and Valley region and the other at the woodlands edge of  Schuylkill Center for Environmental and Education in the Piedmont ecosystem. Both sites face a great deal of deer pressure.

AMD&Art Project, 1995 -2005.
Vintondale,  Vintondale, PA

Collaboration with Julie Bargmann, Landscape Architect. Robert Deason, Hydrogeologist and T. Allan Comp Historian

Acid mine drainage pollutes hundreds of miles of streams in Pennsylvania.  At Mine Number Six in Vintondale, in the coal mining region of south central Pennsylvania, artists, landscape architects, scientists and historians collaborated on ways to treat AMD while interpreting the coal mining history and the passive treatment processes.  This project creates a public park and water treatment facility.

Watermap: Friends' Central School, 2003
Wynnewood, PA

Tributaries of the Delaware and Schuylkill Rivers are deeply sandblasted into bluestone paved terrace. When it rains, the rainwater flows into the runnels of the tributaries and then into deeply inscribed Delaware River, creating a watershed in miniature.

Cloud Stones: Mineral Springs Park, Seattle Arts Council, 2004
Seattle, WA

The highly polished black stone domes reflect the sky and the clouds formations. Text sandblasted around the domes tells of the types of weather which these cloud formations bring.   The white domes have more of evening presence, and their text tells of the moon and stars.  As the light fades at dusk, the white domes remain bright while the dark domes sink into the shadows.

Lotic Meander - Ontario Science Centre's Project Art, 2007

"Lotic Meander" is a serpentine walkway that resembles a dried riverbed, located outside the Ontario Science Centre's Great Hall. Modelled on the meanderings of the Humber River, the snakelike stream is 91.4 metres long and winds along a path that takes up most of the Solar Patio.  The piece is made from 116 granite slabs from India, and 8 nearly perfect hemispherical or hemiellipsoidal black domes carved from boulders imported from China.  The highly polished domes are similar, in appearance, to the domes used to house surveillance cameras.

Along some of the curves of the path there are also nicely polished smooth round glass pebbles, in variously coloured translucent glass.

"Lotic" in the title refers to the ecosystems of different magnitudes of flowing water in nature.

Awards
1992 Pew Fellowships in the Arts
1999 Fabric Workshop and Museum, Philadelphia
2001 Mid-Atlantic Arts Foundation grant
2001, Excellence in Estuary Award, Partnership for the Delaware Estuary, Inc.
2010, 2010 Year in Review Award, Americans for the Arts Public Art Network, for "Ridge and Valley" 
2015 Artist-in-Residence at the McColl Center for Art + Innovation.
 2015, DC Water Green Infrastructure Challenge Award with Urban Rain Design and Nitsch Engineering
2018 Henry Meigs Environmental Leadership Award, Schuylkill Center for Environmental Education
 2019, Woman of Environment Arts, Penn Futures

References

External links
 Levy's website

1960 births
20th-century American sculptors
Living people
Pew Fellows in the Arts
21st-century American sculptors
Yale University alumni
Temple University alumni
Artists from Philadelphia
Sculptors from Pennsylvania
American women sculptors